Celluloid Dreams is a French film production and distribution company that also operates as an international sales company. Additionally, the company runs a video on-demand platform, The Auteurs, in conjunction with The Criterion Collection. Celluloid Dreams has been involved in films such as Palindromes, Son of Rambow, DiG!, I'm Not There, How She Move and Funny Games. Additionally, they have their own YouTube channel CelluoidDreams.

Filmography

External links 

Film production companies of France
International sales agents